The 2012 Coupe Internationale de Nice was the 17th edition of an annual international figure skating competition held in Nice, France. It was held on October 24–28, 2012. Medals were awarded in the disciplines of men's singles, ladies' singles, pair skating, and ice dancing on the senior level and singles on the junior level.

Entries

Senior results

Men

Ladies

Pairs

Ice dancing

Junior results

Men

Ladies

References

External links
 Entries
 Official site
 Starting Orders/Detailed Results

Coupe Internationale de Nice
Coupe Internationale De Nice, 2012
Coupe Internationale de Nice